Philip William Bancroft is a New Zealand rugby league player who represented New Zealand in two Test matches in 1989.

Playing career
A Canterbury and South Island representative in the 1980s, Bancroft played for the Glenora Bears in the Auckland Rugby League competition and also represented Auckland. In 1988, 1989 and 1990 Bancroft won the Painter Rosebowl Trophy for being the leading goalscorer in the competition.

Bancroft played for English Rugby League Club Rochdale Hornets in the 1985/86 season, enjoying a good season but narrowly missing out on promotion.

In 1989 Bancroft was called up to the New Zealand national rugby league team and played in two test matches against Great Britain.

Bancroft later returned to Canterbury playing for the Haswell Hornets club and the Canterbury Country Cardinals in the 1994 Lion Red Cup.

References

Living people
Auckland rugby league team players
Canterbury rugby league team players
Glenora Bears players
Halswell Hornets players
New Zealand national rugby league team players
New Zealand rugby league players
Point Chevalier Pirates players
Rochdale Hornets players
Rugby league halfbacks
Rugby league players from Canterbury, New Zealand
South Island rugby league team players
Year of birth missing (living people)